Walter Burdun (also Burdi, de Burton, de Bordon, or de Bourton) was an English medieval churchman, college fellow, and university chancellor.

From 1306 to 1308, Burdun was Chancellor of the University of Oxford. He was a Fellow of Merton College, Oxford between 1312 and 1328. where he served as bursar. He was a prebend at Salisbury through Simon of Ghent, Bishop of Salisbury and also a Chancellor of Oxford University.

References

Year of birth unknown
Year of death unknown
14th-century English Roman Catholic priests
Fellows of Merton College, Oxford
Chancellors of the University of Oxford
13th-century English people
14th-century English people